is a former Japanese football player.

Playing career
Kitahara was born in Ina on May 10, 1976. After graduating from Tokyo Gakugei University, he joined the newly promoted J2 League club, Omiya Ardija in 1999. He played several matches as a substitute midfielder in early 1999. However he did not play at all in late 1999. In 2000, he moved to the newly promoted J2 club, Mito HollyHock. He played several matches as a substitute midfielder in early 2000. However he did not play at all by the middle of 2000. In 2001, he moved to the Prefectural Leagues club Gunma FC Horikoshi. The club was promoted to the Regional Leagues in 2002 and the Japan Football League in 2004. He retired at the end of the 2004 season.

Club statistics

References

External links

1976 births
Living people
Tokyo Gakugei University alumni
Association football people from Nagano Prefecture
Japanese footballers
J2 League players
Japan Football League players
Omiya Ardija players
Mito HollyHock players
Arte Takasaki players
Association football midfielders